Cai Tsungyi (born 12 March 1914, date of death unknown) was a Chinese racewalker. He competed in the men's 50 kilometres walk at the 1936 Summer Olympics.

References

1914 births
Year of death missing
Athletes (track and field) at the 1936 Summer Olympics
Chinese male racewalkers
Olympic athletes of China
Place of birth missing